Jay Sadguru Swami is the arti sung at Swaminarayan Sampradaya mandirs. This arti was composed by Muktanand Swami on 5 November 1802.  During the arti, a lighted lamp is waved before murtis, representations of Swaminarayan and other deities. In shikharbaddha mandirs, arti is performed five times a day; in dev mandirs, also known as Hari mandirs, arti is performed in the morning and evening only.

See also 
 Swaminarayan
 Swaminarayan Sampradaya

References

Hindu music
Swaminarayan Sampradaya
Aarti